Tche (Ꚓ ꚓ; italics: Ꚓ ꚓ) is a letter of the Cyrillic script. The shape of the letter originated as a ligature of the Cyrillic letters Te (Т т Т т) and Che (Ч ч Ч ч).

Tche is used in the old Abkhaz alphabet, where it represents the palato-alveolar ejective affricate . It correspondis to Ҷ.

Tche is also used in the old Komi language alphabet.

Computing codes

See also 
Ҷ ҷ : Cyrillic letter Che with descender
Ҵ ҵ : Cyrillic letter Te Tse
Cyrillic characters in Unicode

Cyrillic letters